Venezuela Department may refer to two different entities:
 Venezuela Department (1820)
 Venezuela Department (1824)

Department name disambiguation pages